Kodi Parakkuthu is a 1988 Indian Tamil-language action film, directed by Bharathiraja. The film starred Rajinikanth, who worked with Bharathiraja nearly a decade after their last film 16 Vayathinile (1977).

Plot 

A mafia leader tries to kill policeman Sivagiri, who took down his illegal businesses, with the help of a lookalike. Later, Sivagiri discovers that the leader is responsible for his father's death.

Cast 
 Rajinikanth as DCP Erode Shivagiri/JDP Dhadha/16 Vayadhinile Parattai
Amala as Aparna
Bhagyalakshmi as Dhadha's love interest
Manivannan as GD (voice dubbed by Bharathiraja)
 Sujatha as Sengamalam
A. R. Srinivasan as Shivagiri's uncle
Janagaraj as Chinna Dhadha
 Vijayan as Shivagiri's father (Guest appearance)
 Sangili Murugan as Dhadha (Guest appearance)
S. R. Veeraghavan as I.G.
Ilavarasu as Police constable
Sudha as Madhavi
Vinod Raj as Jailer Meyyappan

Production

Soundtrack 
The music was composed by Hamsalekha. The song "Selai Kattum" is set in the Carnatic raga Shree.

The song Oh Kadhal Ennai was reused version of the song O Meghave with a tune in between taken from another song Mussanjeli Nammuralli  - both from Hamsalekha's earlier Kannada movie Ranaranga released the same year.

Reception 
N. Krishnaswamy of The Indian Express wrote, "Kodi Parakkudhu is a flag that flutters in full flow, its not a half-mast performance and there's no question of Bharathiraja having surrendered creativity at the altar of starry caprice". Jayamanmadhan of Kalki, however, reviewed the film more positively, saying that while Bharathiraja fans may feel cheated due to the film not being in his usual style, it was a treat for Rajinikanth fans. The film was commercially unsuccessful.

References

External links 
 

1980s Tamil-language films
1988 action films
1988 films
Fictional portrayals of the Tamil Nadu Police
Films directed by Bharathiraja
Films scored by Hamsalekha
Indian action films